Argyrotaenia burnsorum is a species of moth of the family Tortricidae. It is found in the United States, where it has been recorded from Texas.

The wingspan is about 19–20 mm. Adults have been recorded on wing from February to April.

References

B
Endemic fauna of Texas
Moths of North America
Moths described in 1960